The 1984 Los Angeles Dodgers finished in fourth place in the National League West.

Regular season

Season standings

Record vs. opponents

Opening day lineup

Notable transactions 
September 1, 1984: Juan Bell was signed as an amateur free agent by the Dodgers.
December 7, 1984: Acquired Joe Szeneley, Jose Torres and John Serritella from the Kansas City Royals for Joe Beckwith
December 8, 1984: Acquired Carlos Diaz and Bob Bailor from the New York Mets for Sid Fernandez

Roster

Player stats

Batting

Starters by position 
Note: Pos = Position; G = Games played; AB = At bats; H = Hits; Avg. = Batting average; HR = Home runs; RBI = Runs batted in

Other batters 
Note: G = Games played; AB = At bats; H = Hits; Avg. = Batting average; HR = Home runs; RBI = Runs batted in

Pitching

Starting pitchers 
Note: G = Games pitched; IP = Innings pitched; W = Wins; L = Losses; ERA = Earned run average; SO = Strikeouts

Other pitchers 
Note: G = Games pitched; IP = Innings pitched; W = Wins; L = Losses; ERA = Earned run average; SO = Strikeouts

Relief pitchers 
Note: G = Games pitched; W = Wins; L = Losses; SV = Saves; ERA = Earned run average; SO = Strikeouts

Awards and honors 
1984 Major League Baseball All-Star Game
Fernando Valenzuela reserve
NL Pitcher of the Month
Rick Honeycutt (April 1984)
Orel Hershiser (July 1984)
NL Player of the Week
Candy Maldonado (April 16–22)
Orel Hershiser (July 9–15)

Farm system

Major League Baseball Draft

The Dodgers drafted 28 players in the June draft and 13 in the January draft. Of those, six players would eventually play in the Major Leagues.

The Dodgers first round pick in the June draft was pitcher Dennis Livingston from Oklahoma State University. He remained with the Dodgers organization until 1987 before moving to the Montreal Expos system. In six seasons in the minors he accumulated a record of 24-36 and a 5.13 ERA in 165 games (59 as a starter). This draft did produce three Major League relief pitchers in Tim Scott (round 2), Darren Holmes (round 16) and Jeff Nelson (round 22) as well as utility player Tracy Woodson (round 3).

Notes

References 
Baseball-Reference season page
Baseball Almanac season page

External links 
1984 Los Angeles Dodgers uniform
Los Angeles Dodgers official web site

Los Angeles Dodgers seasons
Los Angeles Dodgers
Los